Swamp River may refer to:

Canada
In British Columbia, the portion of the Cariboo River above Cariboo Lake formerly known as the Swamp River
Swamp River (Ontario), in Thunder Bay District